Wanshan may refer to:

Wanshan Archipelago, in Guangdong, China
Wanshan District, in Guizhou, China
 Wanshan Special Vehicle, a manufacturer of trucks in China.